Paul Pressler is the chair of the board of directors of eBay. He was previously CEO of Gap, Inc., chairman of Walt Disney Parks and Resorts and a partner at the private equity firm Clayton, Dubilier & Rice.

Early life and career
Pressler received his bachelor's degree in business economics from the State University of New York at Oneonta. He was then hired as an urban planner in New York City. After six months he changed jobs to Remco Toys. In 1982, he was hired as vice president of designing and marketing development for Kenner-Parker Toys and was an executive producer of The Care Bears Movie.

Disney
Following closure of his unit, Pressler took a product licensing post at Disney Consumer Products in 1987 and created a deal with Mattel for pre-school Disney toys which competed with Playskool and Fisher Price. Pressler was then selected as the head of Disney Store. While running Disney Store, he brought together builders, designers, engineers and merchandisers to design the next prototype Disney Store that opened in third quarter of 1994. He used the "land" concept from the parks for the prototype to "make it more entertaining by utilizing more storytelling".

In 1994, Pressler became the head executive of Disneyland. During this period, Pressler was "credited with guiding the theme parks through tough times", but also known for cost-cutting measures such as reducing customer service training, having workers wash their own uniforms and closing rides and shows early. He attempted to discontinue a disabled discount but was forced to back down after a backlash. With the cost cutting, Disneyland was profitable while attendance declined. 

Pressler was promoted to president of Walt Disney Attractions in December 1998 under its chair, Judson Green. In 2000, he was promoted to chairman of Walt Disney Parks and Resorts (formerly Disney Attractions). With the retirement on December 31, 2000, of Disney's, vice chairman Sandy Litvack. Anaheim Sports began reporting to him. Pressler oversaw a major expansion, including the opening of the new California Adventure theme park, Disney's Grand Californian Hotel, the remodeling of the Disney's Paradise Pier Hotel, a new retail, dining and entertainment complex called Downtown Disney and a new multi-story parking area. The new park and hotels opened in early 2001, and the entire complex was named the Disneyland Resort.

CEO and board positions
Pressler became the chief executive at Gap Inc. in September 2002 after initially turning them down. Gap was struggling with an over-expansion of store locations. Pressler brought in several other Disney executives. In summer 2004, he had Gap launch a new chain, Forth & Towne. He resigned on January 22, 2007.

Pressler was elected to the Avon board of directors on July 14, 2005.

Pressler was chairman of David’s Bridal, Inc. from 2012 to 2018, AssuraMed Holding, Inc. from 2010 to 2013 and SiteOne Landscape Supply, Inc. from to 2013 to 2017.

Pressler was appointed to the eBay board of directors on September 29, 2015. He was promoted chair of the board on June 29, 2020, following the resignation of Tom Tierney.

References

Living people
Walt Disney Parks and Resorts people
Disney executives
Private equity and venture capital investors
Place of birth missing (living people)
Year of birth missing (living people)
American retail chief executives
American chairpersons of corporations
Directors of eBay
Gap Inc. people